The Combined Military Hospital Lahore is the largest tertiary care teaching hospital operated by the Pakistan Army. Its primary function is to provide specialized medical treatment to Armed forces personnel, their dependents (immediate families), as well as the general public. It is headed by a Brigadier from the Army Medical Corps of the Pakistan Army.

History 
The hospital was established in 1854 as a British Military Hospital (BMH) by the British military as a specialized treatment center for British officers serving in the subcontinent. In 1927, the British military raised another hospital nearby named the Indian Military Hospital (IMH). The BMH and IMH served as treatment facilities for British troops and Indian troops serving the British respectively. It was not until 1943 that the British decided to amalgamate both hospitals into one contiguous unit (primarily due to administrative issues), and named it the Combined Military Hospital.

In 1947, after Pakistan's Independence, the Combined Military Hospital was handed over to the Pakistan Army. It was a 200-bed hospital at that time. The need for increasing medical facilities and the increasing population mandated several expansions of the hospital.

In 1982, its capacity was increased to 800 beds and was upgraded to a Class A hospital. It saw further expansion in 2004 with the addition of 200 more beds, increasing its capacity to 1000 beds. The construction of new CMH blocks for 1100 beds capacity is under process will be completed in 2024.The CMH Lahore was Commanded by Maj Gen Adil Khan, Brig Asghar Choudhry, Brig Sehar Zameer Siddiqui, Brig Rahat, Brig Naseer Hussain (2014), Maj Gen Qamar Ul Haq Noor Chaudhry (2015), Maj Gen Muhammad Aleem (2017), Brig Nasir Javed Malik (2019),Brig Amir Bin Tahir (2020), Gen Adil Husnain (2022)

Hospital facilities 
Being a Class A hospital, it serves as the principal medical hospital for armed forces personnel in the Lahore region. Although, the hospital's primary task is to cater military officers, soldiers, and their families; it provides equal healthcare facilities to civilians.

Some of the specialized healthcare units available in the hospital are:
 Trauma center
 Department of Medicine
 Department of Gastroenterology
 Department of Pulmonology
 Department of Mental illnesses 
 General Surgery Department
 Department of Neurology
 Department of Ophthalmology
 Department of Ear, Nose, Throat
 Dedicated Breast Cancer Clinic
 Thoracic Surgery Department
 Intensive Care Unit
 Orthopedic Department
 Plastic Surgery
 Rehabilitation Department
 Hand and Upper Limb Surgery Department 
 Maxillofacial Center
 Army Cardiac Center

Training / teaching facilities 
The hospital serves as a teaching hospital to CMH Lahore Medical And Dental College. Most of the clinical faculty of the medical college are doctors of the Army Medical Corps serving in the hospital.

It is also recognized by the College of Physicians and Surgeons Pakistan for imparting FCPS training in the following departments:
 Medicine
 Pediatrics
 Surgery
 Orthopedic Surgery
 Gynecology & Obstetrics
 Ear, Nose, Throat
 Psychiatry
 Anaesthesiology
 Dermatology
 Chemical Pathology
 Histopathology
 Radiology
 Vascular Surgery
 Pulmonology
 Neurology

See also 
 Pakistan Army Medical Corps
 Pakistan Army

References 

Hospitals in Lahore
Military hospitals
Military medical facilities in Pakistan
1854 establishments in British India
Hospitals established in 1854